Oligonychus sacchari, the sugarcane mite, yellow mite or sugarcane yellow mite, is a species of mite.

Ecology
The main plant host for O. sacchari is sugar cane, but it also been observed on other grasses, including Bambusa arundinacea, Setaria italica, Sorghum arundinaceum, Sorghum halepense and Sorghum vulgare, and an orchid of the genus Dendrobium.

Taxonomy
Oligonychus sacchari was first described by E. A. McGregor in 1942 under the name Paratetranychus sacchari. The type specimen was living on sugar cane on the island of Puerto Rico.

References

Trombidiformes
Agricultural pest mites
Animals described in 1942